Erland Carlsson (August 24, 1822 – October 19, 1893) was a Swedish-American Lutheran minister.  He was one of the founders and served as president of the Augustana Lutheran Synod.

Background
Erland Carlsson was born in the Suletorp farm village, Älghult parish, Uppvidinge Municipality, Kronoberg County, Småland province, Sweden. He was one of three children born to Carl Jonsson and Stina Lisa Carlsdotter.  His father died when Carlsson was 10 years of age. His mother remarried Erland Danielsson with whom she had three additional children. Carlsson grew up in a pious home and experienced a crisis of faith as a teenager, which influenced him to become a priest. As a young prospective priest, Carlsson was influenced by Pietist priest Peter Lorenz Sellergren and the Läsare movement. He received his venia concionandi from Bishop Esaias Tegnér in 1844, allowing him to preach as a lay preacher. He graduated from the University of Lund in 1848 and was ordained at Växjö Cathedral into the Diocese of Växjö of the Church of Sweden the following year after serving at Ramlösa and Lessebo. He was minister to congregations in Växjö, Härlöv, Öjaby and Lessebo between 1849 and 1853. At a time when the Conventicle Act was still in effect, his revivalist preaching and activity in the temperance movement made church leaders such as Bishop  suspicious.

Career
In 1853, Tuve Hasselquist needed a minister for his newly founded Immanuel Lutheran Church in Chicago, Illinois, and requested Peter Fjellstedt, head of a mission school to send him one. Carlsson became his second choice after the first was unable. In 1853, Carlsson and a group of 176 emigrants, including a party of 17 members of his parish, departed for the United States from Kalmar. He became the minister of the Immanuel Lutheran Church, joining the Lutheran Synod of Northern Illinois, and helped many new Swedish immigrants. Carlsson soon started a Christian school and Sunday school. His provisional church constitution made an impact on the rest of the Swedish-American Lutheran Church, becoming a model for other congregations. He sought to give the church a middle ground in a low-church, Sellergren-like influence which still respected the church's traditional liturgical rite and vestments. Carlsson would lead Immanuel through the 1854 cholera outbreak, during which one-tenth of the congregation's members died, and the Chicago Fire of 1871, which destroyed the church buildings and the homes of 90% of the congregation. Carlsson served at Immanuel Lutheran Church until 1875. He then moved to historic Andover Swedish Lutheran Church (now Augustana Lutheran Church) in Andover, Illinois, where he would serve until 1887, although he suffered a stroke in 1884, which limited his pastoral work.

After a schism in the Northern Illinois Synod, the Scandinavian Evangelical Lutheran Augustana Synod in North America (later known as Augustana Lutheran Synod) was established in 1860. The organizing meeting was held at the Jefferson Prairie Settlement near Clinton, Wisconsin. A group of Swedish Lutheran pastors including Jonas Swensson, Lars Paul Esbjörn, Tuve Hasselquist, Eric Norelius and Carlsson pioneered development of the Augustana Lutheran Synod. Carlsson would serve as president of the Augustana Lutheran Synod from 1881 to 1888. He would also be the business manager of Augustana College and Seminary in Rock Island, Illinois, as well as the editor of the Missionären and manager of other church publications. He and his daughter Emmy were key in founding the Augustana Hospital in Chicago, which initially opened in Carlsson's home in 1884.

Carlsson retired in 1889 due to his poor health and moved to Kansas. He spent the end of his life in Chicago. He died at his daughter's home there on October 19, 1893, and was buried in Graceland Cemetery.

Family 
In 1855, Carlsson married Eva Charlotta Andersson. They had three children, Eben Carlsson, Samuel E. Carlsson, and Emmy Christine Evald, who became a teacher, philanthropist, and feminist.

See also 

 Gustaf Unonius, pioneering Swedish Episcopal pastor in Chicago

References

Related reading
Lindquist, Emory. Shepherd of an Immigrant People: The Story of Erland Carlsson (Augustana College Library. 1978)
Wolf, Edmund Jacob. The Lutherans in America; a story of struggle, progress, influence and marvelous growth (New York. J.A. Hill. 1889)
Johnston, Lawrence Albert. The Augustana Synod : a brief review of its history, 1860-1910 (Rock Island, IL: Augustana. 1910) 
Arden, G. Everett. Half a Million Swedes (Columbus OH: Wartburg Press. 1958)
Granquist, Mark and Maria Erling. The Augustana Story: Shaping Lutheran Identity in North America (Minneapolis, MN: Augsburg. 2008)

External links
Carlsson Hall infosite, Augustana.edu

1822 births
1893 deaths
People from Uppvidinge Municipality
Lund University alumni
Swedish emigrants to the United States
19th-century American Lutheran clergy
Burials at Graceland Cemetery (Chicago)